Denis Vorobyov (born 2 January 1979) is a Belarusian cross-country skier. He competed in the men's sprint event at the 2002 Winter Olympics.

References

External links
 

1979 births
Living people
Belarusian male cross-country skiers
Olympic cross-country skiers of Belarus
Cross-country skiers at the 2002 Winter Olympics
Place of birth missing (living people)